Kelvin Seabrooks (born March 10, 1963 in Charlotte, North Carolina) is a retired American  boxer who won the International Boxing Federation bantamweight title and defended it four times.

Boxing career

Amateur career
Seabrooks started boxing with the local Police Athletic League at age 11. Seabrooks went to win four N.C. Golden Gloves championships. A highlight of his boxing career was winning a bronze medal at the 1980 Olympic trials; however, he didn't get to go to the Olympics. President Jimmy Carter boycotted the Summer Olympics in Moscow that year to protest the December 1979 Soviet invasion of Afghanistan.

Professional career
Seabrooks turned professional in 1981. In 1987, Seabrooks won the United States Boxing Association bantamweight championship, but gave up his title to compete in the world championship. He became the International Boxing Federation world bantamweight champion that year with a fifth-round knockout of Miguel Maturana in Cartagena, Colombia. His first  title defense against Frenchman Thierry Jacob, ended in controversy as it was initially declared a draw but later ruled on as a win for Seabrooks. His next defense was more straight forward beating filipino contender Ernie Cataluna via fourth round stoppage. He would eventually lose the title to Orlando Canizales in 1988. Seabrooks retired in 1995 after six consecutive losses.

Professional boxing record

Later life

Seabrooks retired from boxing in 1995 and was inducted into the Carolinas Boxing Hall of Fame in 2003. He now works as a security guard at Charlotte-Mecklenburg Schools and trains boxers. He also gives motivational speeches to students. Seabrooks is also in the process of establishing a nonprofit organization called Kelvin Seabrooks Sports & Education Center, Inc., to provide mentorship, tutoring and recreational programs to help kids succeed. The center's mission will be to provide a safe haven in the community for youth to enhance their abilities and skills, leading them on the right track toward the future, said Seabrooks. Seabrooks lives with his wife in east Charlotte.

See also
List of world bantamweight boxing champions

References

External links

 

|-

1963 births
Living people
American male boxers
African-American boxers
Sportspeople from Charlotte, North Carolina
Boxers from North Carolina
Super-bantamweight boxers
World bantamweight boxing champions
International Boxing Federation champions